Electron is a genus of the motmots, a family of Neotropical near passerine birds. The genus has two species:

Both inhabit humid evergreen tropical forest. Both occur in Central America, and the broad-billed motmot occurs in a large region of South America as well.

They are distinguished from other motmots by their much wider bills. The rackets on their tails are less dramatic than those of many other motmot species and may be absent. The species are very similar except in adult plumage (but the adult keel-billed resembles the juvenile broad-billed). A mixed pair apparently courting has been observed (Howell and Webb 1995).

The name Electron is a Latinization of the Ancient Greek word for amber, and can mean "bright" in scientific names (Jaeger 1978). The name was given 46 years before an elementary particle was named electron.

References
 
 
 Peterson, Alan P. (Editor). 1999. Zoological Nomenclature Resource (Zoonomen). Accessed 2007-08-17.

 
Taxa named by Johannes von Nepomuk Franz Xaver Gistel
Bird genera